Coccothrinax nipensis is a palm which is endemic to eastern Cuba. It was described by Attila Borhidi and O.Muñiz in the year 1981.

References

nipensis
Trees of Cuba
Plants described in 1981